Edson Alvarado (born 27 September 1975) is a Mexican former footballer, who represented Mexico at the 1996 Summer Olympics. He was born in Mexico City.

Clubs
1994-1998 :  Club Necaxa
1998-1999 :  UANL Tigres
1999 :  CF Monterrey
1999-2000 :  Santos Laguna
2000-2001 :  Tecos UAG
2001 :  Santos Laguna
2002 :  Tecos UAG
2002 :  Club Necaxa
2003 :  Lagartos Tabasco Villahermosa

External links

1975 births
Living people
Mexican footballers
Association football midfielders
Club Necaxa footballers
Tigres UANL footballers
C.F. Monterrey players
Santos Laguna footballers
Tecos F.C. footballers
Liga MX players
Olympic footballers of Mexico
Footballers at the 1996 Summer Olympics

Mexico international footballers
Footballers at the 1995 Pan American Games
Pan American Games silver medalists for Mexico
Pan American Games medalists in football
Medalists at the 1995 Pan American Games